Philippe Manoury (born 19 June 1952) is a French composer.

Biography
Manoury was born in Tulle and began composition studies at the Ecole Normale de Musique de Paris with Gérard Condé and Max Deutsch. He continued his studies from 1974 to 1978 at the Conservatoire de Paris with Michel Philippot, Ivo Malec, and Claude Ballif. From 2004 until 2012, Manoury served on the composition faculty at the University of California, San Diego, where he taught composition, electronic music, and analysis in the graduate program. After retiring from teaching at UCSD, he currently lives in Strasbourg, France.

Music
Manoury's work is strongly influenced by Pierre Boulez, Karlheinz Stockhausen, and Iannis Xenakis, and his early work from 1972 to 1976 combines serial punctualism with the densely massed elements characteristic of the music of Stockhausen and Xenakis, and the paintings of Jackson Pollock. Works such as Sound and Fury are of interest because of the use of computer-assisted composition. Sound and Fury also uses a very large orchestra, which is symmetrically disposed, and makes quite extensive use of left-right spatial effects.

Since the 1980s, Manoury has been closely associated with the American computer researcher Miller Puckette, first at IRCAM and subsequently at UCSD. The Sonus ex machina series of works (Jupiter, Pluton, Neptune and La Partition du Ciel et de l'Enfer), which were developed in collaboration with Puckette, are among the first pieces to utilize real-time audio signal processing, and Pluton was the first ever composition using Puckette's groundbreaking software Max.

His Abgrund—pour grand orchestre was commissioned by the Bavarian State Opera together with the Orchestre symphonique de Montréal and premiered by the Bavarian State Orchestra on November 26, 2007. It has been described as "a work that will neither disturb nor annoy [...] a pleasant and perhaps harmless string of dissonant semi-climaxes, little jolts, and resting phases. It has an invigorating effect, is easy to concentrate on . . .". In it "Manoury [...] mercifully knows how to use [the abundance of percussion instruments] in ways far more discriminately than his contemporaries beholden to one bongo-frenzy after another". "Philippe Manoury hit[s] the right mix between shallow and deep, melodic and dissonant, placating and strident, stasis and progress, simplicity and complexity. The steady run-up—stop—tighten—burst—relax scheme may not be novel at all, but it paid dividends [in 'Abgrund']".

Writings
Manoury, Philippe. 1998. La note et le son: Écrits et entretiens, 1981-1998, with a foreword by Danielle Cohen-Levinas. Musique et musicologie: Les dialogues. Paris: L'Harmattan. 
Manoury, Philippe. 2001. Entretiens avec Daniela Langer. Paris : Musica falsa.

Selected compositions
Operas
 60e parallèle for 9 singers, large orchestra and electronics (1995–96)
 K… (2001)
 La frontière, chamber opera for 6 singers, 9 instruments and electronics (2003)
 La nuit de Gutenberg, opera in a prologue and 12 scenes. Premiered at the Opéra national du Rhin, Strasbourg, 24 September 2011

Orchestral works
 Numéro huit, op. 8 (1980, revised 1987)
 Pentaphone, 5 Pieces for large orchestra, op. 24 (1993)
 Prelude and Wait (1995)
 Sound and Fury (1999)

Concertos
 Echo-Daimónon, for piano, electronics and large orchestra (2011–12) 
 Bref Aperçu sur l'Infini for cello and orchestra (2015)

Chamber music
 Numéro cinq for piano and 13 instruments, op. 5 (1976)
 Instantanés (1983)
 Version La Rochelle, op. 10a (1983)
 Version étude, op. 10b (1983)
 Version Baden-Baden, op. 10c (1985)
 La Partition du ciel and de l’enfer, op. 19 (1989)
 Passacaille pour Tokyo for piano and 17 instruments (1994)
 Fragments pour un portrait, 7 Pieces for ensemble of 30 instruments (1998)
 Épitaphe for 7 instruments, op. 29 (1995)
 Portrait of the Artist as a Young Man for 10 instruments (2004)
 Identités remarquables for 23 instruments (2005)
 Strange Ritual for 21 instruments (2005)
 Focus (1973)
 Le tempérament variable (1978)
 String Quartet, op. 6 (1978)
 Musique I for 2 harps, guitar, mandolin and 2 percussionists (1986)
 Musique II for 7 brass (2.2.2.1) and 2 marimbas, op. 14 (1986)
 Petit aleph (1986)
 Solo de vibraphone (1986)
 Le livre des claviers, Six pieces for 6 percussionists (1987)
 Deux mélodies (1988)
 Michigan Trio for clarinet, violin and piano (1992)
 Gestes for string trio (1992)
 Métal for sixxens sextett (1995)
 Ultima for clarinet, cello and piano (1996)
 Last for bass-clarinet and bass-marimba (1997)
 Stringendo for string quartet (2010)
 Tensio for string quartet (2010)
 Chaconne for solo cello and 6 cellos (2015)

Live electronics
 Zeitlauf for choir, 14 instruments and electronics, op. 9 (1982)
 Jupiter for flute and live electronics, op. 15a (1987, revised 1992)
 Pluton for piano and live electronics (1988, revised 1989)
 Neptune for 3 percussionists and live electronics, op. 21 (1991)
 En écho for soprano and live electronics (1993–1994); words by Emmanuel Hocquart
 Partita I for viola and live electronics (2006)

Piano
 Sonata for 2 pianos (1972, revised 1994)
 Cryptophonos (1974)
 Puzzle (1975)
 Toccata (1998) from de « Passacaille pour Tokyo »
 La ville (...Première sonate) (2001–2002)
 Veränderungen (...Deuxième sonate...) (2007)

Vocal
 Aleph for 4 singers and orchestra (1985–87)
 Xanadu for soprano and clarinet (1989); words by Samuel Taylor Coleridge
 Chronophonies I and II for mezzo-soprano, baritone-bass and large orchestra (1994)
 Douze moments for mezzo-soprano and large orchestra (1998)
 Slova for choir (2001–2002)
 Fragments d'Héraclite for choir (2003)
 Noon for soprano, choir, large orchestra, and electronics (2003)
 Blackout,  Melodrama for alto and 13 instruments (2004)
 On-iron for choir, electronics and video (2005)

Discography
 "Fragments pour un portrait" – Ensemble Intercontemporain, Kairos, 0012922KAI, 2009
 Quatuor à cordes – Quatuor Arditti MFA, Harmonia Mundi, C 5139, 1984
 Cryptophonos – Claude Helffer (pno) MFA Harmonia Mundi, C 5172, 1986
 Petit Aleph – Pierre-André Valade (Flute), ADDA, 581 075, 1988
 Zeitlauf – Groupe Vocal de France, Ensemble Intercontemporain, conducted by Peter Eotvös, Erato, ECD, 75552, 1990
 Le livre des claviers – Les percussions de Strasbourg, Philips Classics, 444 218–2, 1993
 Epitaphe – Ensemble FA, conducted by Dominique My, MFA 216007, 1995
 Jupiter and La Partition du Ciel et de l'Enfer – Sophie Cherrier (flute) and Ensemble Intercontemporain. Conducted by Pierre Boulez. In Compositeurs d'aujourd'hui, Adès, 206 062, 1996
 Pluton – Ilmo Ranta, piano, Technique Ircam Ondine Records, ODE 888–2, 1996
 60ème parallèle – Orchestre de Paris, conducted by David Robertson, Naxos 8.554249/50, 1997
 En écho and Neptune – Donatienne Michel-Dansac (soprano); Roland Auzet, Florent Jodelet, and Eve Payeur (percussion), Technique Ircam ACCORD, 465 526–2, 1998
 Complete Chamber Music – Ensemble Accroche Note, Assai 222052, 2002

Awards and recognition
Officier of the Ordre des Arts et des Lettres, 2014

References

Bibliography
Boulez, Pierre, and Patrick Greussay. 1988. "Entretien avec Philippe Manoury". Traverses, nos. 44–45:128–37
Poirier, Alain. 2001. "Manoury, Philippe". The New Grove Dictionary of Music and Musicians, ed. S. Sadie and J. Tyrrell. London: Macmillan.

External links
 https://web.archive.org/web/20110717054355/http://www.durand-salabert-eschig.com/formcat/catalogues/manoury_philippe.pdf (in French)
 
 http://mediatheque.ircam.fr/articles/textes/Brindeau97a/ (in French)
 Profile at UCSD (in English)

1952 births
Living people
People from Tulle
Conservatoire de Paris alumni
École Normale de Musique de Paris alumni
French classical composers
French male classical composers
French opera composers
Male opera composers
20th-century classical composers
University of California, San Diego faculty
Officiers of the Ordre des Arts et des Lettres
20th-century French composers
20th-century French male musicians